James Robertson Nowlin (born November 21, 1937) is a senior United States district judge of the United States District Court for the Western District of Texas and a former state legislator.

Education and career

Born in San Antonio in Bexar County, Texas, Nowlin received a Bachelor of Arts degree from Trinity University in 1959, a Master of Arts from Trinity University in 1962, and a Juris Doctor from the University of Texas School of Law in 1963. He was in the United States Army as a captain from 1959 to 1960. He was in the Judge Advocate General's Corps of the United States Army Reserve from 1960 to 1968 and in private practice in San Antonio from 1963 to 1965. He was from 1965 to 1966 a legal counsel for the United States Senate Committee on Labor and Public Welfare in Washington, D.C.

Legislative service

Nowlin was a Democratic member of the Texas House of Representatives from 1967 to 1971 and a Republican from 1973 to 1981. In 1973, he and Joe Sage became the first two Republicans to represent Bexar County in the Texas legislature. Rather than seeking a third consecutive term in the House, Nowlin ran unsuccessfully as a Republican in 1970 for the Texas State Senate. Nowlin returned to the private practice of law in San Antonio in 1966 and remained so engaged until 1981.

Federal judicial service

On September 17, 1981, United States President Ronald Reagan nominated Nowlin to a seat vacated by Judge Jack Roberts. He was confirmed by the United States Senate on October 21, 1981, and received his commission on October 26, 1981. He served as Chief Judge from 1999 to 2003. On May 31, 2003, he assumed senior status.

Personal

Upon his death, Judge Nowlin will be interred at the Texas State Cemetery in Austin.

References

Sources

1937 births
Living people
Texas lawyers
Judges of the United States District Court for the Western District of Texas
United States district court judges appointed by Ronald Reagan
20th-century American judges
United States Army officers
Texas Democrats
Texas Republicans
Members of the Texas House of Representatives
Military personnel from San Antonio
Politicians from San Antonio
Trinity University (Texas) alumni
University of Texas School of Law alumni
21st-century American judges
Lawyers from San Antonio